Karen Heagle (born 1974) is an American artist, known for autobiographical and art historical subject matter. Her work comments on contemporary culture through a queer perspective with a focus on feminist agendas.

Life and education 
Heagle was born in Tomah, Wisconsin and currently lives in Brooklyn, New York. 
She received a BFA from the University of Wisconsin–Stout, and an  MFA in Painting from Pratt Institute. She also attended Skowhegan School of Painting and Sculpture.

Work and Exhibition History 
Past notable solo exhibitions include, Let Nature Take Its Course and Hope It Passes at I-20 in 2011, and Battle Armor at Churner and Churner in 2013. Recent group exhibitions include, Interior Dialogue at Sargent's Daughters, and  Paper at the Saatchi Gallery in 2013.

Her work is included in Judith Rothschild Contemporary Drawing Collection at the Museum of Modern Art in New York, the Saatchi Gallery in London, the Deste Foundation in Athens, Greece, and part of The Elizabeth A. Sackler Center for Feminist Art

Recently, she was included in Nylon Magazine in:"Ten Contemporary Artists to Get to Know" by Kari Adelaide. </ref>

References

1967 births
Painters from Wisconsin
American women painters
Living people
People from Monroe County, Wisconsin
Pratt Institute alumni
University of Wisconsin–Stout alumni
21st-century American women artists
Skowhegan School of Painting and Sculpture alumni